The Masks of the Devil is a lost 1928 American drama silent film directed by Victor Sjöström and written by Marian Ainslee, Ruth Cummings, Svend Gade and Frances Marion. The film stars John Gilbert, Alma Rubens, Theodore Roberts, Frank Reicher and Eva von Berne. The film was released on November 17, 1928, by Metro-Goldwyn-Mayer.

Cast 
John Gilbert as Baron Reiner
Alma Rubens as Countess Zellner
Theodore Roberts as Count Palester
Frank Reicher as Count Zellner
Eva von Berne as Virginia
Ralph Forbes as Manfred
Ethel Wales as Virginia's Aunt
Polly Ann Young as Dancer

References

External links 
 

1928 films
1920s English-language films
Silent American drama films
1928 drama films
Metro-Goldwyn-Mayer films
Films directed by Victor Sjöström
Films set in Austria
Lost American films
American black-and-white films
American silent feature films
Films based on German novels
1928 lost films
1920s American films